The 2022 Sunderland City Council election took place on 5 May 2022 to elect members of Sunderland City Council. This is on the same day as other elections across the United Kingdom.

Background
24 of the 75 seats will be up for election All 25 wards were originally due to elect councillors, however the election in Copt Hill ward was postponed following the death of the city's only UKIP candidate. 

Since the first election in 1973, Sunderland has been a strongly Labour council, which consistently achieves over 60% control of the council. 2021 represented the worst year for Labour in terms of seats; the party lost 9 with 39.2% of the vote. The Conservatives gained 6 with 34.8%, the Liberal Democrats gained 4 with 15.4%, UKIP did not make any further gains with 4.5%, and the Green Party lost representation on the council with 5.2%.

There had been speculation ahead of the election that the Labour Party could lose overall control of Sunderland City Council for the first time in its history. 

The seats up for election this year were last elected in 2018. In that election, Labour won 61 seats (a net loss of 4 seats). The Conservatives gained 2 seats while the Liberal Democrats gained 3 seats on the Council. 1 independent councillor lost their seat.

Election results 
After the election, the Labour Party maintained control of the Council. Labour's majority was reduced to 4, having lost 1 seat to the Liberal Democrats in Doxford Ward. In Fulwell, the Conservatives also lost a seat to the Liberal Democrats with a swing of 15%

The results defied media speculation that Labour would continue to haemorrhage seats like in 2021 and 2019. Labour leader Graeme Miller commented that "It was a good night" for his party because they "stopped the rot". Conservative Group leader Anthony Mullen, blamed his party's poor performance on the Partygate Scandal, after the Conservatives failed to gain seats in Washington South, Rhyope, St Anne's or Silksworth. Liberal Democrat leader Niall Hodson said his party's gains from both Labour and the Conservatives were a result of “good candidates working hard for a long period of time”.

Council composition
In the last council, the composition of the council was:

After the election, the composition of the council was:

Results by ward
An asterisk indicates an incumbent councillor.

Barnes

Castle

Copt Hill (countermanded)

Note: This ward election took place on Thursday 16 June 2022. Copt Hill ward election was rescheduled due to the death of UKIP candidate Reg Coulson.

Doxford

Fulwell

Hendon

Hetton

Houghton

Millfield

Pallion

Redhill

Ryhope

Sandhill

Shiney Row

Silksworth

Southwick

St. Anne's

St. Chad's

St. Michael's

St. Peter's

Washington Central

Washington East

Washington North

Washington South

Washington West

References

Sunderland
Sunderland City Council elections